Mathurin Lussault (died 1572) was a French goldsmith based in Paris who supplied the royal family and Mary, Queen of Scots.

Lussault was described as a "goldsmith who follows the court" and merchant goldsmith or goldsmith in ordinary to Catherine de' Medici. He made jetons or counters engraved with her arms and ciphers for use in her counting house.

Lussault provided Mary, Queen of Scots, with gloves, pins, combs, and brushes in 1551. An note in an inventory of the jewels of Mary, Queen of Scots, records that Lussault was given a string of 36 pearls in July 1556 to make nine entredeux pieces for a sapphire collar. 

Lussault was a patron of the sculptor Ponce Jacquiot, who designed a fireplace for the goldsmith's house in the Rue St Germain-l'Auxerrois.

Mathurin Lussault was killed in Paris during the St. Bartholomew's Day massacre along with his wife Françoise Baillet and son Jacques or Laurent and a female servant. Lussault was stabbed at his front door by a gold wire maker, Thomas Croizier. A gold watch found on the body of his son was sold to the Duke of Anjou, and his wife's hands were cut off to remove her gold bracelets.

References

External links
 Comptes des Enfants de France pour l'année 1551, BnF Gallica, MS Français 11207

16th-century French people
1572 deaths
Deaths by stabbing in France
Court of Mary, Queen of Scots
French goldsmiths
Material culture of royal courts